"That's The Way My Heart Goes" is the debut single by Swedish pop music singer Marie Serneholt, released from her debut album Enjoy the Ride on February 22, 2006.

The single debuted at No. 2 on the Swedish charts and reached No. 1 on the Digital Sales; the song was backed with a strong promotional campaign in her home country where the physical single ensured Gold Status selling over 10,000 copies and also was certified Gold for digital sales over 10,000.

It spent over four months inside the Swedish Top 60 and after six weeks out of the chart the single re-entered at No. 60 in August 2006; in Germany the single debuted at No. 34, falling out the top 40 in the next consecutive weeks, but re-entering at #30; since then, the single has spent two months inside the Top 30, peaking at No. 19.

It has been released throughout Europe; a South and North American release was expected for late 2006, but it seems that the plans were scrapped and nothing has been announced about a release date for other markets.
Marie recently received the Guldmobilen Award from the Swedish mobile phone company 3 for over 10,000 ringtones sold from their website.

The single relies heavily on the Janet Jackson single "That's the Way Love Goes" sonically, and lyrically, however it has a more uptempo beat.

Music video
The video was filmed in Stockholm, Sweden in January 2006 and premiered in late February in Sweden. Lacking from a real concept, the video shows Marie in different sets with different costumes.

The music video had two different versions, the first one, the "Swedish Version", showed in Sweden and Finland, this was the original version of the video, but due to the reaction of some fans towards the video alleging that was "Too Sweet" or "Too Cheesy", scenes of Marie mounted on a pink unicorn were deleted, using close-ups of her face, making the "European Edition", this version is the one that will be shown around the world and the one included on the European CD Maxi.

It was reported that the video had a cost of US$500,000 (3,700,000 kr).

Track listing
Swedish CD single
"That's The Way My Heart Goes" Radio Version – 3:34
"That's The Way My Heart Goes" Instrumental – 3:33

European two-track CD single
"That's The Way My Heart Goes" Radio Version – 3:36
"That's The Way My Heart Goes" Michel Feiner Remix (The Attic) Radio Edit – 3:49

European CD Maxi
"That's The Way My Heart Goes" Radio Version – 3:36
"That's The Way My Heart Goes" Michel Feiner Remix (The Attic) – 7:28
"That's The Way My Heart Goes" Michel Feiner Dub – 7:25
"That's The Way My Heart Goes" Punkstar Remix – 6:03
"Can't Be Loved" – 3:53
Video: That's The Way My Heart Goes [European Version]

Charts

References

2006 debut singles
2006 songs
Marie Serneholt songs
Songs written by Jörgen Elofsson
English-language Swedish songs